Royden Axe (September 1937 – 5 October 2010) was a British car designer.

Early life and career
Axe was born in Scunthorpe and attended Scunthorpe Grammar School (now St Lawrence Academy).

Axe began his career in 1959 with the Rootes Group where he progressed first to chief stylist and then to design director. Rootes became part of Chrysler Europe in 1966. Axe led the styling efforts on almost all of the Chrysler/Rootes/Simca products of the early to mid-1970s; the car models involved included the Simca 1308/Chrysler Alpine and Chrysler Horizon which won European Car of the Year in 1976 and 1978, respectively. Following Chrysler Europe's collapse in 1977, Axe moved to Detroit to head Chrysler's styling studios in the United States.

In 1982, Axe returned to the United Kingdom, joining British Leyland (BL) where he took over as styling director from David Bache (who had been sacked from BL owing to disagreements with the company boss Harold Musgrove over the still under development Austin Maestro), and was responsible for the building of a new styling studio at their Canley, Coventry plant; the former opened in 1982. He also recruited a new team. Early projects from the new studio included Project XX (the Rover 800) and the MG EX-E concept car.

In 1991, Axe became head of the Warwick-based vehicle design consultancy Design Research Associates (DRA), which resulted from a management buyout of Rover's design studio in 1986. DRA was acquired by Arup in 1999.

Examples of Axe's car designs
1967 Sunbeam Rapier and Sunbeam Alpine fastback coupés
 1970 Hillman Avenger / Plymouth Cricket
 1975 Chrysler Alpine (Talbot)
 1976 Hillman Hunter
 1977 Iran Khodro Paykan facelift
 1979 Chrysler Horizon (Talbot)
 1980 Talbot Tagora 
 1985 MG EX-E concept car
 1986 Rover CCV concept car
 1986 Rover 800 (developed in conjunction with the Honda Legend)
 1989 Rover 200/400 (R8)
 1994 Bentley Java concept car

Axe was also involved in the design of the 1984 Austin Montego. The design had been initiated prior to his joining BL, but he was able to make last-minute changes to it shortly before it entered production. Cosmetic changes – which aimed to improve the by-then dated design – included black trim along the car's waist line. Due to BL's financial problems, the release of the Montego, and the related David Bache-designed Austin Maestro hatchback had been delayed by several years.

Personal life

After selling DRA to Arup in 1999, Axe moved to Florida. He died on 5 October 2010 after battling cancer for two years.

Bibliography
 A Life in Style, Autobiography of Roy Axe,

References

Footnotes

Sources

British automobile designers
1937 births
2010 deaths
People from Scunthorpe
Deaths from cancer in Florida